The 2021 European Badminton Championships was the 28th tournament of the European Badminton Championships. It was held in Kyiv, Ukraine, from 27 April to 2 May 2021.

Tournament 
The 2021 European Badminton Championships was the 28th edition of the championships. This tournament was organized by Badminton Europe along with the local organizer Ukrainian Badminton Federation and sanctioned by the Badminton World Federation. This tournament being played for the first time in Ukraine.

The tournament consisted of men's (singles and doubles), women's (singles and doubles), and also mixed doubles.

Venue 
The tournament was held at the Palace of Sports in Kyiv, Ukraine.

Point distribution
Below are tables with the point distribution for each phase of the tournament based on the BWF points system for the European Badminton Championships, which is equivalent to a Super 500 event.

Medal summary

Medalists

Medal table

Participants 
213 players from 36 nations will participate this championship.

Men's singles

Seeds 

 Viktor Axelsen (final)
 Anders Antonsen (champion)
 Rasmus Gemke (quarter-finals)
 Hans-Kristian Vittinghus (semi-finals)
 Mark Caljouw (quarter-finals)
 Brice Leverdez (quarter-finals)
 Toma Junior Popov (third round)
 Thomas Rouxel (quarter-finals)

Wild card 
Badminton Europe (BEC) awarded a wild card entry to Danylo Bosniuk of Ukraine.

Finals

Top half

Section 1

Section 2

Bottom half

Section 3

Section 4

Women's singles

Seeds 

 Carolina Marín (champion)
 Mia Blichfeldt (withdrew)
 Yvonne Li (quarter-finals)
 Kirsty Gilmour (semi-finals)
 Neslihan Yiğit (semi-finals)
 Line Kjærsfeldt (quarter-finals)
 Line Christophersen (finalist)
 Lianne Tan (quarter-finals)

Wild card 
Badminton Europe (BEC) awarded a wild card entry to Anna Mikhalkova of Ukraine.

Finals

Top half

Section 1

Section 2

Bottom half

Section 3

Section 4

Men's doubles

Seeds 

 Kim Astrup / Anders Skaarup Rasmussen (semi-finals)
 Marcus Ellis / Chris Langridge (semi-finals)
 Vladimir Ivanov / Ivan Sozonov (champions)
 Ben Lane / Sean Vendy (quarter-finals)
 Mark Lamsfuß / Marvin Emil Seidel (final)
 Jones Ralfy Jansen /  Peter Käsbauer (quarter-finals)
 Christo Popov / Toma Junior Popov (quarter-finals)
 Daniel Lundgaard / Mathias Thyrri (first round)

Finals

Top half

Section 1

Section 2

Bottom half

Section 3

Section 4

Women's doubles

Seeds 

 Gabriela Stoeva / Stefani Stoeva (champion)
 Chloe Birch / Lauren Smith (final)
 Maiken Fruergaard / Sara Thygesen (semi-finals)
 Selena Piek / Cheryl Seinen (semi-finals)
 Émilie Lefel / Anne Tran (second round)
 Alexandra Bøje / Mette Poulsen (quarter-finals)
 Amalie Magelund / Freja Ravn (quarter-finals)
 Linda Efler / Isabel Herttrich (quarter-finals)

Wild card 
Badminton Europe (BEC) awarded a wild card entry to Polina Buhrova and Mariia Stoliarenko of Ukraine.

Finals

Top half

Section 1

Section 2

Bottom half

Section 3

Section 4

Mixed doubles

Seeds 

 Marcus Ellis / Lauren Smith (finalist)
 Thom Gicquel / Delphine Delrue (quarter-finals)
 Mark Lamsfuß / Isabel Herttrich (semifinals)
 Mathias Christiansen / Alexandra Bøje (semifinals)
 Robin Tabeling / Selena Piek (quarter-finals)
 Rodion Alimov / Alina Davletova (champion)
 Sam Magee / Chloe Magee (quarter-finals)
 Ronan Labar / Anne Tran (quarter-finals)

Wild card 
Badminton Europe (BEC) awarded a wild card entry to Valeriy Atrashchenkov and Yelyzaveta Zharka of Ukraine.

Finals

Top half

Section 1

Section 2

Bottom half

Section 3

Section 4

References

External links 
Official website
Tournament link

European Badminton Championships
European Badminton Championships
Badminton
International sports competitions hosted by Ukraine
2021 in Ukrainian sport
Badminton tournaments in Ukraine
Sports competitions in Kyiv
2020s in Kyiv
European Badminton Championships
European Badminton Championships